Bertrand Owundi Eko'o (born 15 October 1993) is a Cameroonian professional footballer who plays as a centre-back.

Club career

Early career
In 2012, Owundi played for Unisport du Haut–Nkam in Cameroon's Elite One, winning the Cameroon Cup after finishing runner-up the previous year. In 2013, he signed with Coton Sport and won a league title that season. The following year, he made his first move abroad, joining Algerian Ligue Professionelle 1 side Amal Arbaâ.

Minnesota United
In February 2018 it was announced that Owundi had joined fellow Cameroonian Frantz Pangop at Major League Soccer club Minnesota United FC on a transfer from Rainbow FC. Owundi was released by Minnesota at the end of their 2018 season.

Forge FC
On 17 January 2019, Owundi signed with Canadian Premier League side Forge FC. That season, he made 22 league appearances, two Canadian Championship appearances and two appearances in CONCACAF League on route to a CPL Championship win for Forge. On 8 January 2020, the club announced that Owundi would not be returning for the 2020 season.

International career
Owundi made his senior international debut on 12 August 2017 in a 2018 African Nations Championship qualification match against São Tomé and Príncipe.

Honours
Unisport Haut–Nkam
Cameroonian Cup: 2012

Coton Sport
Elite One: 2013

Forge FC
Canadian Premier League: 2019

References

External links
National Football Teams profile
Minnesota United profile
 

1993 births
Living people
Association football defenders
Cameroonian footballers
Cameroonian expatriate footballers
Expatriate footballers in Algeria
Cameroonian expatriate sportspeople in Algeria
Expatriate soccer players in the United States
Cameroonian expatriate sportspeople in the United States
Expatriate soccer players in Canada
Cameroonian expatriate sportspeople in Canada
Unisport Bafang players
Coton Sport FC de Garoua players
RC Arbaâ players
Les Astres players
Minnesota United FC players
Charlotte Independence players
Forge FC players
Elite One players
Algerian Ligue Professionnelle 1 players
Major League Soccer players
USL Championship players
Canadian Premier League players
Cameroon international footballers
Cameroon A' international footballers
2018 African Nations Championship players